Christoph von Sigwart (28 March 1830 – 4 August 1904) was a German philosopher and logician. He was the son of philosopher Heinrich Christoph Wilhelm Sigwart (31 August 1789 – 16 November 1844).

Life
After a course of philosophy and theology, Sigwart became professor at Blaubeuren (1859), and eventually at Tübingen, in 1865.

Philosophical work
The first volume of Sigwart's principal work, Logik, was published in 1873 and took an important place among contributions to logical theory in the late nineteenth century. In the preface to the first edition, Sigwart explains that he makes no attempt to appreciate the logical theories of his predecessors; he intended to construct a theory of logic, complete in itself.

The Logik represents the results of a long and careful study not only of German but also of English logicians. In 1895 an English translation by Helen Dendy was published in London. Chapter 5 of the second volume is especially interesting to English thinkers as it contains a profound examination of the induction theories of Francis Bacon, John Stuart Mill and David Hume. His Kleine Schriften contains valuable criticisms on Paracelsus and Giordano Bruno.

Quotations

Publications
 Ulrich Zwingli, der Charakter seiner Theologie (1855). Google (Oxford) Google (Stanford) Google (UCal)
 Spinoza's neuentdeckter Traktat von Gott, dem Menschen und dessen Glückseligkeit (1866). Google (Harvard) Google (Oxford)
 Beiträge zur Lehre vom hypothetischen Urteile (1871). Google (UMich)
 Logik (1873–1878). 2 volumes. 2nd ed., 1889-1893. 3rd ed., 1904. 4th ed., 1911. 5th ed., 1924.
Volume 1, 1873. Die Lehre vom Urtheil, vom Begriff und vom Schluss. 1889. Google (UCal) IA (UToronto) 1904. Google (Harvard)
Volume 2, 1878. Die Methodenlehre. IA (UToronto)
 Kleine Schriften (1881). 2 volumes. Google (UCal) 2nd ed., 1889.
 Vorfragen der Ethik (1886).
 Die Impersonalien, eine logische Untersuchung (1888). Google (UCal) Google (UMich)

English translations
Logic (1895). (Tr. Helen Dendy)
Volume 1. The Judgment, Concept, and Inference. Google (Stanford) Google (UWisc) IA (UToronto)
Volume 2. Logical Methods. Google (Stanford) Google (UMich) Google (UWisc) IA (UToronto)

See also
 Psychologism dispute

Notes

References

External links
 
 

1830 births
1904 deaths
People from the Kingdom of Württemberg
German philosophers
German untitled nobility
19th-century philosophers
19th-century German people
German logicians
German Lutherans
Academic staff of the University of Tübingen
Members of the Privy Council of Württemberg
19th-century German writers
19th-century German male writers
19th-century Lutherans